The Gun Song is the fourth album and second EP by Jennifer Parkin's project Ayria, released in 2008 on the Alfa Matrix label.

Track listing
 "The Gun Song" – 3:28
 "Six Seconds" - 4:36
 "The Gun Song (Killing Me Softly Mix by Daniel B - Front 242)" - 4:37
 "The Gun Song (Angelspit Mix)" - 4:38
 "Six Seconds (Spetsnaz Mix)" - 4:02
 "The Gun Song (Essence of Mind Mix)" - 4:41
 "The Gun Song (Leæther Strip Mix)" - 7:08
 "Six Seconds (David Carretta Mix)" - 5:58
 "The Gun Song (Headscan Mix)" - 4:43
 "Six Seconds (Standeg Mix)" - 5:20

References

2005 EPs
Ayria albums